The Professional is the debut studio album by American record producer DJ Clue?. It was released on December 15, 1998 via Roc-A-Fella Records.

Recording sessions took place at Alien Flyers, at Platinum Island Studios, at Desert Storm Studios, at Soundtrack Studios, at The Hit Factory, at Sound On Sound Studios and at D&D Studios in New York City, at Krosswire Studios in Atlanta, and at Source Sound Labs in Canton. Production was handled by Ken "Duro" Ifill, Buckwild, DJ Scratch, Hangmen 3, Laze-E-Laze, M.O.P., Self, V.I.C., Swizz Beatz and Clue himself.

It features guest appearances from DMX, Fabolous, Big Noyd, Big Pun, Boot Camp Clik, Cam'ron, Canibus, Drag-On, EPMD, Eve, Flipmode Squad, Foxy Brown, Ja Rule, Jadakiss, Jay-Z, Jermaine Dupri, Keith Murray, Lord Tariq, Made Men, Ma$e, Memphis Bleek, Missy Elliott, Mobb Deep, Mocha, M.O.P., Nas, Nature, Nicole Wray, N.O.R.E., Puff Daddy, Raekwon, Redman, R.O.C. and Styles P.

The album peaked at number twenty-six on the Billboard 200 chart, and number three on the Top R&B/Hip-Hop Albums chart. It has been certified gold by the Recording Industry Association of America on January 27, 1999, and then went platinum on August 20, 2001, indicating US sales of over one million units.

Its sequels, The Professional 2 and The Professional 3, were released in 2001 and 2006, respectively.

Track listing 
 "Intro" (featuring Sean "Puffy" Combs) 1:02
 "Ruff Ryders' Anthem" (Remix) (featuring DMX, Drag-On, Eve, Jadakiss and Styles P) (produced by Swizz Beatz, remixed by DURO) 3:52
 "It's On" (featuring DMX) 3:25
 "Fantastic 4" (featuring Cam'ron, Big Pun, N.O.R.E. and Canibus) 5:09
 "Queensfinest" (featuring Nas) (produced by Self) 3:26
 "Exclusive New Shit" (featuring Nature) 3:08
 "Gangsta Shit" (featuring Jay-Z and Ja Rule) 4:38
 "Thugged Out Shit" (featuring Memphis Bleek) 3:54
 "It's My Thang '99" (featuring EPMD, Keith Murray and Redman) 3:00
 "Mariah Carey" (Skit) 0:21
 "Whatever You Want" (featuring Flipmode Squad) (produced by DJ Scratch) 4:06
 "That's The Way" (featuring Fabolous, Foxy Brown and Ma$e) 4:31
 "I Like Control" (featuring Missy Elliott, Mocha and Nicole Wray) 3:48
 "Bitch Be a Ho" (featuring Jermaine Dupri and R.O.C.) 3:23
 "If They Want It" (featuring Fabolous) 4:02
 "Pain in da Ass" (Skit) 0:28
 "The Professional" (featuring Mobb Deep and Big Noyd) (produced by V.I.C.) 3:39
 "Brown Paper Bag Thoughts" (featuring Raekwon) 3:15  
 "Cops & Robbers" (featuring Paul Cain and Lord Tariq)  3:26
 "Made Men" (featuring Made Men) 2:41
 "No Love" (featuring M.O.P.) 4:12
 "Come On" (featuring Boot Camp Clik) 4:31

Charts

Weekly charts

Year-end charts

Certifications

References

External links

DJ Clue? albums
1998 debut albums
Roc-A-Fella Records albums
Albums produced by Buckwild
Albums produced by DJ Clue?
Albums produced by DJ Scratch
Albums produced by Swizz Beatz